Lorenzo Ruiz (1594–1637) was a Chinese Filipino martyr.

Lorenzo Ruiz may also refer to:

Places and things named after Lorenzo Ruiz

In the Philippines

Places
San Lorenzo Ruiz, Camarines Norte
Barangay San Lorenzo, Makati
Barangay San Lorenzo Zone III, Sogod, Southern Leyte
Barangay San Lorenzo Ruiz I and II, Dasmariñas
San Lorenzo Village Puan, Davao City

Churches
Minor Basilica of San Lorenzo Ruiz, Binondo, Manila
San Lorenzo Ruiz Parish, Bacoor, Cavite
San Lorenzo Ruiz Parish, Mabalacat
San Lorenzo Ruiz Diocesan Church, Bayugan
San Lorenzo Ruiz Parish, Taytay, Rizal
San Lorenzo Ruiz Chapel, Imnajbu, Batanes
San Lorenzo Ruiz Chapel, Balanga
San Lorenzo Ruiz Church, Ozamiz City, Misamis Occidental
San Lorenzo Ruiz Parish, Tandang Sora, Quezon City
San Lorenzo Ruiz Chapel, Laurel, Batangas
San Lorenzo Ruiz Parish, Tisa, Cebu City
San Lorenzo Ruiz de Manila Parish Church, San Jose del Monte, Bulacan
Saint Lorenzo Ruiz Shrine Bangued, Abra
San Lorenzo Ruiz and Companion Martyrs Parish, Kaunlaran Village, Navotas
San Lorenzo Ruiz Parish – Talomo, Davao City
San Lorenzo Ruiz Parish – Dagatan, Taysan, Batangas
San Lorenzo Ruiz Parish – Masipit, Calapan
San Lorenzo Ruiz Church, Gusa, Cagayan de Oro
San Lorenzo Ruiz Parish – Pinagpanaan Talavera, Nueva Ecija,
San Lorenzo Ruiz Parish – San Pedro, Laguna
San Lorenzo Ruiz Parish – Santa Rosa, Laguna
San Lorenzo Ruiz Church – Rainbow Village, Bagumbong, Caloocan
San Lorenzo Ruiz Parish – Pag-asa, Kalalake, Olongapo
San Lorenzo Ruiz de Manila Parish – Polo, Mauban, Quezon

Educational institutions
Lorenzo Ruiz Academy, Binondo, Manila
Colegio de San Lorenzo, a Catholic college in Quezon City, founded in 1988
Escuela de San Lorenzo Ruiz – Parañaque, Sucat, Parañaque, founded in 1988
Lorenzo Ruiz de Manila School, Cainta, Rizal, founded in 1990
San Lorenzo Ruiz de Manila School, Marikina, founded in 2003
San Lorenzo Ruiz Montessori, Inc., Bulakan, Bulacan
Colegio San Lorenzo Ruiz de Pilipinas, Paniqui, Tarlac
San Lorenzo School, a non-sectarian school in San Pedro, Laguna
San Lorenzo Ruiz Parochial School, Navotas
San Lorenzo Ruiz Academy of Polomolok
Colegio de San Lorenzo Ruiz de Manila Inc, of Catarman, Northern Samar
Lorenzo Mission Institute, Makati
San Lorenzo Ruiz Center of Studies and Schools, Inc., San Fernando, Pampanga

Other
Plaza San Lorenzo Ruiz, the present name of the plaza fronting Binondo Church, Manila
San Lorenzo Ruiz Diocesan Academy Inc. – San Bartolome, San Leonardo, Nueva Ecija founded in 1989
San Lorenzo Ruiz Hospital – Naic, Cavite (formerly "The First Filipino Saint Hospital")
San Lorenzo Ruiz Women's Hospital – medical clinic located at Malabon, Philippines
San Lorenzo Ruiz Bridge, Bagabag, Nueva Vizcaya

Elsewhere

Churches
Chapel Of St. Lorenzo Ruiz, New York City, New York, United States
St. Lorenzo Ruiz Catholic Church, a Catholic church in Walnut, California, United States
Saint Lorenzo Ruiz Chapel, Bjørnevatn, Vatsø, Norway
Saint Lorenzo Ruiz Church (Parish), Yomitan, Okinawa Prefecture, Japan

Educational institutions
San Lorenzo Ruiz Elementary School, a Catholic school in Mississauga, Ontario, Canada
San Lorenzo Ruiz Elementary School, a Catholic school in Markham, Ontario, Canada
St Lorenzo Ruiz Elementary School, a Catholic school in Saskatoon, Saskatchewan, Canada

Other
San Lorenzo Ruiz de Manila Community Center in Sugar Land, Texas, United States